Siranwali is a town of Daska Tehsil on the Gujranwala-Pasrur road in Sialkot District, Punjab, Pakistan.

History

The Kambojas, Daradas, Kaikayas, Madras, Pauravas, Yaudheyas, Malavas and Kurus invaded, settled and ruled ancient Punjab. After overrunning the Achaemenid Empire in 331 BCE, Alexander marched into present-day Punjab region with an army of 50,000. The Sialkot was ruled by Maurya Empire, Indo-Greek kingdom, Kushan Empire, Gupta Empire, White Huns, Kushano-Hephthalites and Kabul Shahi kingdoms.

In 997 CE, Sultan Mahmud Ghaznavi, took over the Ghaznavid dynasty which was established by his father, Sultan Sebuktegin. In 1005 he conquered the Shahis in Kabul, and followed it by the conquests of Punjab region. The Delhi Sultanate and later Mughal Empire ruled the region. The Punjab region became predominantly Muslim due to missionary Sufi saints whose dargahs dot the landscape of the Punjab region.

After the formation of the Sikh Empire, Sialkot was invaded and occupied by Sikhs. The Muslims were co-operative with them due to shared ethnicity. During the period of British rule, Sialkot district increased in population and importance.

Siranwali was settled by the Sandhu Jat migrants. The Sandhu clan of Siranwali rose position and power under Sandhawalia Jat rule of Maharaja Ranjit Singh. He awarded this jagir to Sardar Lal Singh Sandhu whose daughter married to Ranjit Singh's  elder son Kharak Singh in 1840.After the decline of Sikh empire in 1849, this region was captured by British rule in India.

The predominantly Muslim population supported the All-India Muslim League and Pakistan Movement. After the Independence of Pakistan in 1947, the minority Hindus and Sikhs migrated to India while the Muslim refugees from India settled in the Sialkot. The ruling family departed for India. Their mansion was subsequently acquired by Mewati-speaking Muslim refugees.

Overview
The town is home to grain markets which provides jobs to over fifty thousand people. There are over thirty rice mills located in the area, making it one of the major grain markets in the Punjab region. The town is located close to, and partly merged with, Mianwali Bangla.

Demographics 
The majority of the population are Mewati-speaking, with Punjabi-speaking people forming the next largest group. Urdu is also spoken.

References 

Market towns in Pakistan
Cities and towns in Sialkot District